Kim Byeong-Jun (Hangul: 김병준, Hanja: 金秉俊) (born February 8, 1988 in Seoul) is a South Korean short track speed skater.

References 

 

1988 births
Living people
South Korean male short track speed skaters
Asian Games medalists in short track speed skating
Asian Games gold medalists for South Korea
Short track speed skaters at the 2007 Asian Winter Games
Short track speed skaters at the 2011 Asian Winter Games
Medalists at the 2007 Asian Winter Games
Medalists at the 2011 Asian Winter Games
World Short Track Speed Skating Championships medalists
21st-century South Korean people